Ednorah Nahar (1873-1936) was an African American elocutionist from Boston who flourished between the late 1880s and early 1900s giving dramatic recitations throughout the United States, as well as abroad.

Early life
Ednorah Nahar was born in 1873 in Boston to Amelia (née St. Pierre) and Edwin H. Nahar. She came from a well-known family of Boston and was a cousin to Joan Imogen Howard. Her father was of foreign birth and she was sometimes described as a light-skinned Spaniard or Indian. By 1879, she was enrolled in the Bowdoin School for girls and after completing her grammar school, enrolled in Fort Edward Collegiate Institute in Fort Edward, New York. Her aptitude for elocution was acclaimed and she was assigned a group of younger children to teach, while she continued her own studies. In addition, she took acting courses at the Madison Dramatic School of Dion Boucicault in New York City.

Career
Nahar had her stage debut on November 16, 1886. Within a year, she had given readings at the Chickering Hall, becoming only the second black woman to perform there. On November 17, 1890, she appeared before a crowd of 5,000 accompanied by the United States Marine Band at the Academy of Music in Philadelphia. Nahar traveled widely, performing in ten of the British West Indies colonies and thirty-one US states. By 1893, she had performed over 800 concerts, acting as her own manager and in February of that year, she began to manage for other performers, such as Sissieretta Jones. She appeared with Jones in her 1893 concert tour at Carnegie Hall. Nahar was often mentioned as one of the best elocutionists of the day, along with Hallie Q. Brown and Henrietta Vinton Davis and was praised for her management of concert tours.

In 1896, she planned a trip to Europe including venues in London and Paris and in 1899, Nahar made a trip to London, under the patronage of the Consuelo Vanderbilt, Duchess of Marlborough. She continued performing in the United States through the 1900s performing dramas and also singing. By 1905, she was a resident of New York City

Later Years

On February 28, 1916 Nahar married William F. X. Dierkes, an osteopath and Spanish-American War veteran in Boone, Iowa,. After being involved in an automobile accident., she cut back her appearances, the last one in 1920.

The Dierkes family moved to Westfield, Massachusetts by 1923, where Dr. Dierkes set up a private medical practice. The health of both husband and wife began to fail near the end of 1936, with Ednorah passing away on November 14th and her husband following her four weeks later.

Notes

References

Citations

Bibliography

 
 
 

 

 
 
 
 

1873 births
Date of death missing
People from Boston
African-American people
American public speakers
Elocutionists